Anete Brice (born 13 November 1991) is a Latvian cross-country skier who has competed since 2007. She finished 70th in the 10 km event at the 2010 Winter Olympics in Vancouver.
Brice finished 78th in the individual sprint event at the FIS Nordic World Ski Championships 2009 in Liberec. Her parents are Latvian biathletes Ilmārs Bricis and Anžela Brice.

Her best career finish was eighth in a 5 km event at Estonia in 2010.

References

External links
 
 
 
 

1991 births
Living people
Latvian female biathletes
Latvian female cross-country skiers
Cross-country skiers at the 2010 Winter Olympics
Olympic cross-country skiers of Latvia
Sportspeople from Riga
21st-century Latvian women